Denny L. Hoskins is an American politician. He is a member of the Missouri Senate for the 21st District. A member of the Republican Party, he was first elected to the Senate in 2016. He previously served in the Missouri House of Representatives from 2009 to 2017.

Missouri House of Representatives 

Hoskins was first elected to the Missouri House of Representatives in 2008 to represent the 121st District. Haskins was subsequently reelected in the 2010, 2012, and 2014 elections. Hoskins was term limited and ran for the Missouri Senate in the 2016 election.

Missouri Senate 

Hoskins was elected to the Missouri Senate in the 2016 election to represent the 21st District. In the midst of Missouri facing a budget shortfall, one of Hoskins' first votes as a state senator was to vote for a pay increase for state legislators. Hoskins was one of only two senators to vote for the pay increase.

In 2021, during the COVID-19 pandemic, Hoskins called for a special session of the Missouri legislature to implement legislation to prevent private-sector companies from requiring COVID-19 vaccinations for staff and customers.

Electoral history

State Representative

State Senate

References

Living people
Republican Party Missouri state senators
21st-century American politicians
People from Warrensburg, Missouri
Year of birth missing (living people)